Secession Makes Post-Modern Music is the first, self-produced demo by Italian band Klimt 1918. It was released in 2000.

This first release features a heavy and layered gothic sound, very atmospheric yet melodic, drawing consistent influence from doom metal and reminiscent of Novembre (whose members are featured on the recording) and mid-period Katatonia.

Track listing
 "Schmerzwerk 1976" – 5:46
 "Passive" – 5:41
 "Fever" – 5:17
 "Swallow's Supremacy" – 6:03
 "April" – 9:38

Personnel
Marco Soellner — vocals, guitar
Francesco Tumbarello — guitar
Davide Pesola— bass
Paolo Soellner — drums
Giuseppe Orlando — clean vocals on track 4
Carmelo Orlando — scream vocals
Massimiliano Pagliuso — backing vocals

2000 albums
Klimt 1918 albums